Harvey Francis Bailey  (November 24, 1876 – July 10, 1922) was a Major League Baseball pitcher who played for two seasons. He played for the Boston Beaneaters in 1899 and 1900. He played in the minor leagues through 1908.

External links

1876 births
1922 deaths
19th-century baseball players
Boston Beaneaters players
Major League Baseball pitchers
Baseball players from Michigan
Buffalo Bisons (minor league) players
Palmyra Mormans players
Minneapolis Millers (baseball) players
Grand Rapids Furniture Makers players
Columbus Senators players
St. Paul Saints (AA) players
Dayton Veterans players
Newark Sailors players
Utica Pent-Ups players
Nashville Vols players
Mansfield Giants players
Mansfield Pioneers players
People from Lenawee County, Michigan